Arlas Walter "Foxy" Taylor (March 16, 1896 – September 10, 1958) was a Major League Baseball pitcher who played in  with the Philadelphia Athletics.

External links

1896 births
1958 deaths
Major League Baseball pitchers
Baseball players from Indiana
Philadelphia Athletics players
People from Warrick County, Indiana